Alina Sultana (born 3 December 1984) is a Bangladeshi badminton player.

Early life 
Born in Khulna, Sultana comes from a sports friendly family. Her elder sister, Sabiha Sultana is a national handball player. She first played badminton in class seven in Khulna Fatema Missionary High School.

Career 
Alina Sultana won silver at the 2008 national championship in Bangladesh with Shapla Akhter, conceding against Konika Rani and Jebunnesa Seema in the final. She was the national champion in 2010. In the South Asian Games in 2010, Alina Sultana won bronze with the women's team from Bangladesh. She won bronze medal in 2010 South Asian Games. Sultana finished her level one coaches course in 2017 in Kathmandu, Nepal.

Personal life 
Sultana married fellow sutler Enayetullah Khan. The couple has a daughter, Arshi, born in 2013. She completed her master's degree from Eden Mohila College in finance and banking earning first class.

References

External links 
 
 

1984 births
Living people
People from Khulna
Bangladeshi female badminton players
South Asian Games bronze medalists for Bangladesh
South Asian Games medalists in badminton
Eden Mohila College alumni